General John Campbell, 4th Duke of Argyll KT PC (c. 1693 – 9 November 1770), was a British Army officer and Scottish Whig politician who sat in the House of Commons between 1713 and 1761. From 1729 to 1761 he was known as John Campbell of Mamore.

Biography
The Duke was the son of the Hon. John Campbell of Mamore, the second son of Archibald Campbell, 9th Earl of Argyll, and Elizabeth Elphinstone, daughter of John, 8th Lord Elphinstone.

Marriage and children

In 1720, Campbell married Mary Drummond Bellenden, daughter of John Drummond Bellenden, 2nd Lord Bellenden of Broughton. They had the following children:

 Lady Caroline Campbell (born 12 January 1721, died 17 January 1803)
 Field Marshal John Campbell, 5th Duke of Argyll (born June 1723, died 24 May 1806)
 Lord Frederick Campbell (born 20 June 1729, died 8 June 1816)
 Lord William Campbell (born 1731, died 1778)

He acquired Coombe Bank, at Sundridge, near Sevenoaks Kent, where he commissioned Roger Morris to build a country house for him in the second quarter of the 18th century. The house subsequently passed on his death in 1770 to his second son Frederick.

Military and parliamentary careers
Campbell joined the army in 1710, becoming a Lieutenant Colonel at the age of nineteen. However, he soon entered the world of politics, and at the 1713 general election, he was returned unopposed as Member of Parliament (MP) for the alternating seat of Buteshire.

At the 1715 general election, Campbell stood at Elgin Burghs. He was defeated in the poll, in which two rival delegates were allowed to vote, and the chairman, who was the other candidate, used his casting vote in the resulting tie to return himself. Campbell was returned on petition as MP for the Boroughs on 7 April 1715. At the 1722 general election much the same thing happened again with two rival delegates casting their votes. This time the petition was referred to committee and it took two years before Campbell was returned as MP on 23 January 1725. At the 1727 general election, Campbell succeeded his father as MP for Dunbartonshire, where he was returned unopposed in the general elections of 1734, 1741 and 1747. He was returned unopposed again for Dumbartonshire at the 1754 general election, and supported Newcastle's administration and voted in its defence in the division on Minorca in 1757. He was nominated for governor of Dumbarton castle in 1759 but became involved in the Argyll-Bute family quarrel and was appointed governor of Limerick in compensation. He was returned again at the 1761 general election, but succeeded to the Dukedom two days later and had to vacate his seat in the House of Commons. During most of his tenure as MP for Dunbartonshire, he was Groom of the Bedchamber.

Additionally, Campbell served in the military during his tenure in Parliament—he became Colonel of the 39th Regiment of Foot (1737–1738) and the 21st Regiment of Foot (1738–1752), serving with honour in the Battle of Dettingen in 1743.

On 12 July 1746 Campbell was the questioner of Jacobite figure Flora MacDonald for her role in aiding Charles Edward Stuart to Skye, and produced a written document of Flora's confessions.

He rose quickly up the ranks, becoming a brigadier general in 1743, major general in 1744, and lieutenant general in 1747; he became colonel of the North British Dragoons in 1752, a position he held until his death.

Dukedom
Upon inheriting the dukedom and other titles upon the death of his cousin Archibald Campbell, 3rd Duke of Argyll, he left the House of Commons and became Governor of Limerick and a Scottish representative peer. He became a Privy Councillor in 1762, a general in 1765, and a Knight of the Order of the Thistle in that same year.

Death
The Duke died on 9 November 1770 and is buried at Kilmun Parish Church. He was succeeded in the dukedom and other titles by his elder son John. His younger son Lord William Campbell was the last British Governor of South Carolina.

Ancestry

In popular culture 
In The Black Adder, the first series of historical sitcom Blackadder, the second episode, Born to Be King, has Alex Norton playing the Fourth Duke of Argyll, but this Duke is not John Campbell since the episode is set in 1487, 206 years before Campbell was born, and the Fourth Duke is called Dougal MacAngus.

References

1693 births
1770 deaths
39th Regiment of Foot officers
British Army personnel of the Jacobite rising of 1745
British Army personnel of the War of the Austrian Succession
British Army generals
British MPs 1713–1715
British MPs 1715–1722
British MPs 1722–1727
British MPs 1727–1734
British MPs 1734–1741
British MPs 1741–1747
British MPs 1747–1754
British MPs 1754–1761
4
Knights of the Thistle
Members of the Parliament of Great Britain for Scottish constituencies
Members of the Privy Council of Great Britain
Royal Scots Fusiliers officers
Royal Scots Greys officers
Scottish representative peers
18th-century Scottish landowners
J